The City Avenue Bridges are twin bridges that span the Schuylkill River in Philadelphia, Pennsylvania.  Although the bridges carry the eastbound and westbound lanes of City Avenue, the bridges are not signed with the U.S. Route 1 designation.  The bridges directly connect the Schuylkill Expressway to Lincoln Drive, Kelly Drive, and Ridge Avenue via the Gustine Lake interchange.

References

Gallery

See also

 
 
 
 
 List of crossings of the Schuylkill River

Bridges in Philadelphia
Road bridges in Pennsylvania
Bridges of the United States Numbered Highway System